Love 4 Unity is the third studio album by the London Boys, a British dance pop duo. It was released in 1993. Both "Moonraker" and "Baby Come Back" were released as singles in Germany. Baby Come Back peaked at #27 in Austria.

This was the last album from the duo, although Hallelujah Hits would be released under the name The New London Boys. The album was not successful and the two singles also failed to chart in Germany.

Like previous albums, songwriting and production were by Ralf René Maué.

Track listing
All tracks written by Ralf René Maué except track one written by Eddy Grant.

 Baby Come Back (3:43)
 I Have A Dream (4:12)
 Philadelphia '69 (3:56)
 Knock, Knock, Knock (3:42)
 Moonraker (3:53)
 Oh, Tracy (3:57)
 We're Calling The World (4:11)
 Dreams Of Glory (3:44)
 Walk On By (4:01)
 My Prayer (4:15)
 A Beautiful View Of The Earth (Deep-Affinity Remix) (7:04)

References

1993 albums
London Boys albums